The Lincoln City News Guard is a newspaper serving Lincoln City and its surrounding community in the U.S. state of Oregon. Its predecessor was founded in 1927 (or 1931 or 1932), and is published weekly on Wednesdays. Prior to the 1965 incorporation of Lincoln City, the paper was known as the North Lincoln News Guard, and was published in the communities of Delake and Nelscott. The News Guard was formed after a merger in 1939 of the Coast Guard and the Beach Resort News. 

The Pioneer Newspaper Group of Idaho purchased the News Guard in 1980, along with three other coastal newspapers (the Tillamook Headlight-Herald, the Seaside Signal, and Ilwaco, Washington's Pacific Tribune).

The News Guard has won a number of statewide awards, including a general excellence award for smaller weekly papers in 1969, for photography and special issues in 1980, and more recently for best feature story.

In 2012 Samantha Swindler, then the publisher of the News Guard as well as the nearby Tillamook Headlight, was featured on CBS "60 Minutes" for her previous success in Corbin, Kentucky in bringing down a corrupt sheriff.

References 

Newspapers published in Oregon
Lincoln City, Oregon
1933 establishments in Oregon
Publications established in 1933